Elections for local government were held in Northern Ireland on 15 May 1985, contesting 565 seats in all.

Background

1981 elections
The previous elections had been fought in the middle of the hunger strike and the H-Block Prison Protest. Those elections had shown changes in party representation, with three parties, namely the Ulster Unionist Party (UUP), the Democratic Unionist Party (DUP) and the Social Democratic and Labour Party (SDLP), winning 75% of the seats. On the Unionist side, the DUP arrived at a position of near parity with the UUP, outpolling the latter by 851 votes, although the UUP managed to win more seats overall. Other changes on the Unionist side saw the disbandment of two smaller Unionist parties: the Unionist Party of Northern Ireland in September 1981 and the United Ulster Unionist Party in May 1984. On the nationalist side, while the SDLP maintained its dominant position, a greater number of elected candidates supporting the H-Block protest were elected. In total 36 candidates endorsed by the H-Block committee were elected of whom 21 belonged to the Irish Independence Party. The representation of the centrist Alliance Party was almost halved as their number of seats was reduced from 70 in 1977 to 38 in 1981.

Northern Ireland Assembly and New Ireland Forum
Following the end of the Hunger Strike, attention focused on attempts by the new Secretary of State for Northern Ireland, Jim Prior, to restore devolution. This eventually led to the establishment of the Northern Ireland Assembly which was elected in October 1982. However nationalist parties boycotted the forum and the SDLP instead threw its efforts into the New Ireland Forum. This forum, established in May 1983, reported in May 1984 and represented the combined efforts of the nationalist parties to obtain a solution to the constitutional issue. However the report was rejected by British Prime Minister Margaret Thatcher who rejected each of the three proposals with the words "that is out" in a response that became known as the "out, out, out" speech.

Sinn Féin
The entry into electoral politics of Sinn Féin (SF) became a significant issue in the run up to the elections. SF polled over 10% in the 1982 Assembly election, winning five seats. At the 1983 Westminster election, the party increased their vote share to 13.4% and maintained that level of support in the 1984 European election. The party won their first council seat in a by-election in March 1983, with Seamus Kerr polling 60% in Omagh 'Area D' This was followed by the election of Alex Maskey and Sean McKnight to Belfast City Council in June 1983 and February 1984 respectively. In Dungannon and Fermanagh, independent councillors Seamus Cassidy and John Joe McCusker joined SF.

Prior's successor as Secretary of State, Douglas Hurd, refused to ban SF and also rejected calls by unionists for an anti-violence declaration to be signed by all candidates.

Rates
The expansion of services, particularly leisure began to have an impact in rates at a time when the Rate Support Grant was being cut. The grant was reduced by 1% in 1985. Belfast Leisure Services in particular accounted for 22.7% of the City budget. Rates overall had risen by 8% in the financial year from 1984 to 1985, a figure above the rate of inflation and resulted in the cancellation of a proposed ice rink in Belfast, while that in Bangor had to receive private funding. Since the 1980–1981 financial year, rates had risen by 51.7% ranging from a 17.9% rise in Castlereagh to 80% rises in Omagh and Newry and Mourne.

Legislation

Boundaries
The Local Government (N.I.) Act 1972, Section 50 (1) required a review of local government boundaries and electoral areas in 1981, however it was not until 28 October 1982 that Prior reappointed Sir F. Harrison, who had conducted the previous review in 1971 and 1972. Provisional recommendations were published on 20 May 1983. These led to additional representations and nineteen public hearings before revised recommendations were published on 18 January 1984. Following six further public hearings, the final report was sent to the Secretary of State on 29 May 1984.

The report recommended no change in the number of councils or their names. The number of wards was increased from 526 to 566. Moyle was the only council to lose a ward.

With the wards drawn the government decided that a new procedure would be used to group them together to form District Electoral Areas (DEA). In 1972 the wards had been grouped together into areas of four to eight wards with each area electing a number of councillors equal to the number of wards that it contained. This had been done by the Chief Electoral Officer, a fact that had been criticised for potentially affecting his impartiality.

The District Electoral Areas Commissioner (N.I.) Order was laid before Parliament on 15 December 1983. This provided for the appointment of a commissioner and set him the task of creating electoral areas containing five to seven members. These were to have names rather than an alphabetic designation as before. The debate over the Order in January and February 1984 centred on the merits of STV, the narrower number of councillors in each DEA and the names issue. Unionists argued for DEAs electing four to six councillors.

Results

Overall

By council

Antrim

Ards

Armagh

Ballymena

Ballymoney

Banbridge

Belfast

Carrickfergus

Castlereagh

Coleraine

Cookstown

Craigavon

Derry

Down

Dungannon

Fermanagh

Larne

Limavady

Lisburn

Magherafelt

Moyle

Newry and Mourne

Newtownabbey

North Down

Omagh

Strabane

References

 
Council elections in Northern Ireland
Northern
1985 elections in Northern Ireland